Kargil Airport  is a military airfield in Kargil district  away from Kargil and  from Leh. It is one of two airports in the union territory of Ladakh. The airport will be expanded for operation of commercial jets by the end of 2019.
(Dzongkha and Ladakhi)

History 

The airport was built by the State Government of Jammu and Kashmir in 1996 for civilian operations. and was leased to the Airports Authority of India (AAI).
Kargil rose to prominence in the late 1990s as the site of an undeclared war between India and Pakistan.
AAI transferred the operational control and maintenance to Indian Air Force (IAF) because the airport was vulnerable to shelling by Pakistani forces.

The civil enclave at the airfield is managed by the state government. The terminal building has the capacity to handle 100 peak hour passengers at a time. It was built by the Airports Authority of India (AAI) at a cost of 350 million Rupees, initially for civilian use but was transferred to the Indian Air Force (IAF) in 2003 after it was damaged in the Kargil War in 1999.

The Air Force operates its An-32 aircraft from for an air courier service that transports civilians from Kargil to Srinagar and Jammu during the harsh winter season.

The airport is a much debated issue for local politicians as well as the public who pursue the point that the airport should be opened to commercial civilian services. 
Air Mantra became the first commercial company to land a civilian aircraft at the airport when it landed a 17-seater aircraft with dignitaries, including then Chief Minister of the state Omar Abdullah, on board in January, 2012. However, the service could not be sustained.

The Jammu and Kashmir government sanctioned ₹ billion to upgrade the airport to handle commercial flights. A pre-feasibility study was conducted by the AAI in June 2019. The report recommended extending the existing  runway by another  in order to make it suitable for commercial jets.

References

Airports in Ladakh
Transport in Kargil
Airports established in 1996
1996 establishments in Jammu and Kashmir
20th-century architecture in India